Lee River Wildlife Management Area is a wildlife management area located east of Lac du Bonnet, Manitoba, Canada. It was established in 1997 under the Manitoba Wildlife Act. In 2000, the WMA was protected to Endangered Spaces standards as part of Manitoba’s Protected Areas Initiative.

Lee River Wildlife Management Area is within the Boreal Shield Ecozone.

See also
 List of wildlife management areas in Manitoba
 List of protected areas of Manitoba

References

External links
 Lee River Wildlife Management Area
 iNaturalist: Lee River Wildlife Management Area

Protected areas established in 2000
Wildlife management areas of Manitoba
Protected areas of Manitoba